Peranbu ( Great love) is an Indian Tamil language television drama that premiered on 13 December 2021 on Zee Tamil and streaming on ZEE5. The series stars Vaishnavi Arulmozhi, her first time as a female lead, along with Shamitha Shreekumar and Vijay Venkatesan. This series was launched along with Deivam Thandha Poove in the noon slot. Later it shifted to evening slot and delivering excellent ratings.

Synopsis
Vanathi gets married to Karthik under unexpected circumstances. Her mother-in-law realizes the discomfort between the newlyweds due to their contrasting personalities, and helps the couple get closer.

Cast

Main
 Vaishnavi Arulmozhi as Vanathi Karthik
 An uneducated but respectful woman who was adopted from a child adopt centre by Amutha and Sundaram, has they don't have the child, later Amutha was blessed with baby girl, so Amutha dislikes Vanathi and made her as a house servent. She was Karthik's wife; Rajeshwari's first daughter-in-law; Amutha and Sundaram's adoptive daughter; Aarthi's elder adopted sister; Jeeva and Swetha's sister-in-law
 Shamitha Shreekumar as Raja Rajeshwari
 A wealthy and bold lady, Karthik, Jeeva and Swetha's mother, who wishes her future daughter-in-law to be kind and caring, and so rejects Aarthi and chooses Vanathi for Karthik as his wife. She holds a special affection to Vanathi as they are both orphans, and she sees similarities in how they both grew up.
 Vimal Venkatesan as Karthikeyan (Karthik)
 A business man and puppet of his mother; Vanathi's husband; Aarthi's ex-boyfriend; Rajeshwari's son. He originally likes Aarthi, but later learns of her evil nature and distances himself from her. He married Aarthi's stepsister Vanathi for his mother's wish and likes her but finds it hard to accept her due to the differences in their lifestyles.

Recurring
 Oorvambu Lakshmi as Amutha: Vanathi's adoptive mother; Aarthi's mother; Sundaram's wife (Main Antagonist)
 Akshitha Ashok (2021–2022) / Sreenidhi Sudarshan (2022–present) as Aarthi Jeeva: Jeeva's wife; Vanathi's stepsister; Rajeshwari's second daughter-in-law; Amutha and Sundaram's daughter (Antagonist)
 Pranav Mohanan as Jeeva: Aarthi's husband; Rajeswari's second son; Karthik's younger brother; Swetha's elder brother
 Sivakumar as Sundaram: Amutha's husband; Vanathi's adoptive father; Aarthi's father
 Ravi Shankar as Rajeshwari's husband; Karthik, Jeeva and Swetha's father
 Saira Banu as Swetha: Rajeswari's daughter; Karthik's younger sister
 Vasudeva Krish Madhusudhan as Raja: Rajeshwari's home servent
 Nivetha Ravi as Abi: Aarthi's friend; Karthik's employee (Antagonist)
 Divyapriya Sivam as Maanasa: Jeeva’s ex-girlfriend
 VJ Mounika as Anu: Karthik's one-sided lover

Special episodes
Peranbu series held a two and half hour special episode of Karthik & Vanathi Marriage titled "MEGA Thirumana Vaibhavam" on 20 March 2022.

Peranbu series held a one and half hour special episode titled "Sunday Special" on 25 December 2022.

References

External links 
 
 Peranbu at ZEE5

Zee Tamil original programming
2021 Tamil-language television series debuts
Tamil-language television soap operas
Television shows set in Tamil Nadu
Tamil-language television series based on Bengali-languages television series